JAMA Internal Medicine is a monthly peer-reviewed medical journal published by the American Medical Association. It was established in 1908 as the Archives of Internal Medicine and obtained its current title in 2013. It covers all aspects of internal medicine, including cardiovascular disease, geriatrics, infectious disease, gastroenterology, endocrinology, allergy, and immunology. The editor in chief is Rita F. Redberg (University of California, San Francisco).

According to Journal Citation Reports, the journal's 2021 impact factor is 44.409, ranking it 7th out of 172 journals in the category "Medicine, General & Internal".

Naming history

Abstracting and indexing 
The journal is abstracted and indexed in Index Medicus/MEDLINE/PubMed.

See also
 List of American Medical Association journals

References

External links

                    https://jamanetwork.com

Publications established in 1908
Internal medicine journals
English-language journals
Monthly journals
1908 establishments in the United States
American Medical Association academic journals